Mead Valley is a census-designated place in Riverside County, California. The 2010 United States census reported Mead Valley's population was 18,510.

Mead Valley is located in a valley of the same name in the northeastern Temescal Mountains, south of the city of Riverside and west of the city of Perris. It is drained by the north fork of Cajalco Creek.

Geography
According to the United States Census Bureau, the CDP covers an area of 19.2 square miles (49.6 km), all of it land.

Demographics
At the 2010 census Mead Valley had a population of 18,510. The racial makeup of Mead Valley was 8,383 (45.3%) White, 1,515 (8.2%) African American, 179 (1.0%) Native American, 259 (1.4%) Asian, 17 (0.1%) Pacific Islander, 7,484 (40.4%) from other races, and 673 (3.6%) from two or more races. Hispanic or Latino of any race were 13,395 persons (72.4%).

The census reported that 18,280 people (98.8% of the population) lived in households, 224 (1.2%) lived in non-institutionalized group quarters, and 6 (0%) were institutionalized.

There were 4,163 households, 2,434 (58.5%) had children under the age of 18 living in them, 2,595 (62.3%) were opposite-sex married couples living together, 620 (14.9%) had a female householder with no husband present, 371 (8.9%) had a male householder with no wife present.  There were 239 (5.7%) unmarried opposite-sex partnerships, and 36 (0.9%) same-sex married couples or partnerships. 414 households (9.9%) were one person and 160 (3.8%) had someone living alone who was 65 or older. The average household size was 4.39.  There were 3,586 families (86.1% of households); the average family size was 4.56.

The age distribution was 6,214 people (33.6%) under the age of 18, 2,197 people (11.9%) aged 18 to 24, 4,860 people (26.3%) aged 25 to 44, 3,871 people (20.9%) aged 45 to 64, and 1,368 people (7.4%) who were 65 or older.  The median age was 28.3 years. For every 100 females, there were 106.1 males.  For every 100 females age 18 and over, there were 107.9 males.

There were 4,601 housing units at an average density of 240.0 per square mile, of the occupied units 2,839 (68.2%) were owner-occupied and 1,324 (31.8%) were rented. The homeowner vacancy rate was 2.7%; the rental vacancy rate was 4.5%.  12,174 people (65.8% of the population) lived in owner-occupied housing units and 6,106 people (33.0%) lived in rental housing units.

Government

References

Census-designated places in Riverside County, California
Census-designated places in California